Pearls to Pigs, Vol. 3 is an EP and the 6th release by American Electronic-Alternative Rock band Modwheelmood. It was released digitally via iTunes and Amazon on July 17, 2008. This is the latest of a series of three EP's released by the band though the band members have said they consider the releases to be part of one album.

Track listing

Your Place - 00:35
Lie - 03:42
Thursday - 04:15
Madrid-Changes - 02:40
Scared of Everyone - 05:55

References

Modwheelmood EPs
2008 EPs